People's Leader is a Chinese honorific title. It may refer to:

 Mao Zedong (1893–1976), Chairman of the Chinese Communist Party and paramount leader of China from 1949 to 1976
 Hua Guofeng (1921–2008), Chairman of the Central Committee of the Chinese Communist Party from October 7, 1976 to June 28, 1981
 Xi Jinping (born 1953), General Secretary of the Chinese Communist Party (paramount leader) since 2012